The 1992 Copa del Rey was the 56th edition of the Spanish basketball Cup. It was organized by the ACB and its Final Eight was played in Granada, in the Palacio de Deportes between March 3 and 6, 1992.

This edition was played by the 24 teams of the 1991–92 ACB season. The four first qualified teams of the previous season qualified directly to the Final Eight while teams 5 to 8 joined the competition in the third round.

First round
Teams #2 played the second leg at home.

|}

Second round

|}

Third round

|}

Final Eight Bracket

Final

MVP of the Tournament: John Pinone

External links
Boxscores at ACB.com
Linguasport

Copa del Rey de Baloncesto
Copa